The Gabonese Social and Democratic Union (UDSG) was a political party in Gabon.

History
The UDSG was established on 9 September 1947 by Jean-Hilaire Aubame, and was affiliated with the African Regroupment Party. In the 1952 Territorial Assembly elections it won 14 of the 24 elected seats. It won the same number of seats in the 1957 elections, but the Assembly had been enlarged to 40 seats. Although the UDSG was the largest party, the Gabonese Democratic Bloc-led coalition gained a majority of seats.

The party formed an alliance with the BDG for the 1961 general elections. The BDG's Léon M'ba was the sole presidential candidate and the two parties put forward a joint list for the National Assembly elections. Both M'ba and the joint list were unopposed.

In the 1964 parliamentary elections the UDSG won 16 seats, whilst the BDG won 31. The party did not contest the 1967 general elections, and the country became a one-party state in 1968.

References

Defunct political parties in Gabon
1947 establishments in Gabon
Political parties established in 1947